George Byng, 4th Viscount Torrington (11 October 1740 – 14 December 1812) was an English peer.

Origins
He was the eldest son and heir of George Byng, 3rd Viscount Torrington (1701-1750) by his wife Elizabeth Daniel.

Career

He inherited the Torrington viscountcy and the family seat of Southill Park in Bedfordshire on the death of his father in 1750. He sold Southill to the beer magnate, Samuel Whitbread, in 1795.

Marriage and children
On 20 July 1765 he married Lady Lucy Boyle (1744–1792), a daughter of John Boyle, 5th Earl of Cork, by his wife, Margaret Hamilton, by whom he had seven children, three sons who all predeceased him, and four daughters:

 Lucy Elizabeth Byng (17 October 1760 – 20 September 1844), who married Orlando Bridgeman, 1st Earl of Bradford, 29 May 1788.
 Georgiana Elizabeth Byng (1768 – 11 October 1801), who married John Russell, later 6th Duke of Bedford, 1786.
 William Henry Byng (27 November 1769 – 23 November 1770), predeceased his father.
 Isabella Elizabeth Byng (21 September 1773 – 1 May 1830), who married Thomas Thynne, 2nd Marquess of Bath, 14 April 1794.
 William Henry Byng (baptized 4 June 1775 – 1792), predeceased his father.
 George Byng (baptized 24 March 1777 – 13 October 1792), predeceased his father.
 Emily Byng (1779 – 3 September 1824), who married the Hon. Henry Seymour of Brighthelmston, Sussex, 1 July 1801.

Death and succession
He died on 14 December 1812, and as he left no surviving male issue he was succeeded in the viscountcy by his younger brother John Byng, 5th Viscount Torrington (1743-1813), who died less than a month later.
`

See also
 Viscount Torrington

References

External links

1740 births
1812 deaths
Viscounts in the Peerage of Great Britain
George
People from Southill, Bedfordshire